Gyrophthorus is a genus of lichenicolous (lichen-dwelling) fungi in the phylum Ascomycota. The relationship of this taxon to other taxa within the phylum is unknown (incertae sedis), and it has not yet been placed with certainty into any class, order, or family. The genus was circumscribed in 1990 by Josef Hafellner and Leopoldo Sancho, with Gyrophthorus perforans assigned as the type species.

Species
Gyrophthorus crustulosae 
Gyrophthorus gracilis 
Gyrophthorus perforans 

All three Gyrophthorus species are parasitic on lichens from genus Umbilicaria.

See also
 List of Ascomycota genera incertae sedis

References

Ascomycota enigmatic taxa
Taxa described in 1990
Taxa named by Josef Hafellner
Lichenicolous fungi